Dana Evans may refer to:
 Dana Evans (athletic director) ( 1874–1924), American athlete, coach and athletics administrator
 Dana Evans (basketball) (born 1998) is an American basketball player